Završe pri Dobjem is a small settlement in the Municipality of Dobje in eastern Slovenia. The municipality was traditionally part of the Styria region. It is now included with the rest of the municipality in the Savinja Statistical Region.

Name
The name of the settlement was changed from Završe to Završe pri Dobjem in 1953.

References

External links
Završe pri Dobjem on Geopedia

Populated places in the Municipality of Dobje